Rabindra Guha (born 25 October 1934) is a Bengali poet of the Hungry generation movement in literature who subsequently started the Neem Sahitya Andolan with Mrinal Banik and Biman Chattopadhyay from the steel factory city of Durgapur in West Bengal. He has written several collections of poetry, short stories and novels. He is known mainly for the language of the Bengali diaspora which he adopted and developed for his narratives. He lived in Kolkata until the Hungry generation movement died down at the end of the 1960s, and shifted thereafter to Durgapur. At the end of 1970s, he shifted his base to New Delhi where he invented his narrative language of the Bengali diaspora, i.e. of people who live outside West Bengal. Rabindra Guha is a diasporic post-modern writer with a prolific body of work in relation to inner as well as outer diaspora. He has been a creator of language which is a fantastic combination of national and local dialect. His work had been recently accoladed in Jessore University.

Career
Rabindra Guha came to India with his parents during the Partition of India and toiled for a foothold. He was good at studies and chose the profession of a management adviser to various institutions. He left his profession to become a full-time writer when he shifted to New Delhi. There with his son he started a venture in television production. A group which called itself Dilli Haaters developed around him. Prominent members of that literary group included Dipankar Dutta, Pranji Basak, Dilip Foujdar, Krishna Mishra Bhattacharjee, etc.

Works

Novels
Rajputanar Itikatha ( Novel ) 1965.
Prem Atakna Santras ( Novel ) 1966.
Padadhwani Protidhwani ( Novel ) 1966.
Mebarer Patan ( Novel ) 1967.
Loharia ( Novel ) 1969.
Dahan ( Novel ) 1969.
Drohopurush ( Novel ) 1998.
Surjer Saat Ghora ( Novel ) 1999.
Navikunda Ghirey ( Novel ) 2000.
Shikanjer Pakhi Khamosh ( Novel ) 2001.
Dhundhlaa ( Novel ) 2003.
Aami Dagdha Ekjon Manush ( Memoirs ) 2004.
Natokey Lipsa Nei ( Drama )
Ihadilli Shaharnamaa 2018.
Ujan Dahar 2007
Aami O Aamar Dibasdogdho Bondhura-- Uhara Tahara (autobiografical novel) 2018
Phana 2012 (novel)
Uromanush uppakhan 2019 (Novel) 
Prose-- Kano Likhi Kivabey Likhi ( Collection of prose and readers reaction) 2012
Bad Banglar Kabitay Ritir Biparit Riti 2019
Kranti Britter Pala 2018 (Dumdum Junction Publication)

Short stories
Janamanush ( Short Story ) 1981.
Joiguner Padma ( Short Stories ) 1998.
Galper Bhuban ( Short Story ) 2001.
Sammukhe Furnace 1985

Poetry
Rabindra Guhor Kobita ( Poetry ) 1980.
Nirbachito Kobita ( Poetry ) 1994.
Doridra Juboraj ( 8Poetry ) 1996.
Hasan Tariker Rupali Ilish ( Poetry ) 2003.
Dilli Haatars ( Poetry ) 2003.
Ong Udghurna Bajrojoni Aswakhurdhoni Ong 2006

See also
Samir Roychoudhury
Hungry generation
Malay Roy Choudhury
Tridib Mitra
Falguni Roy
Shakti Chattopadhyay
Anil Karanjai
Subimal Basak
Sandipan Chattopadhyay

References

Sources
Chinho 27th Edition. Edited by Shaheed Iqbal, Chinho Foundation Org Publishers, August 2014.
Haowa49 Rabindra Guha Special Issue. Edited by Samir Roychoudhury, Haowa49 Publishers, Kolkata 2003.
Neem Sahitya Bettanto. Edited by Mrinal Banik, Durgapur, West Bengal. 2004
Shahar Rabindra Guha Special Issue. Edited by Ajit Ray, Shahar Publishers, Dhanbad, Jharkhand. 2002.
Rarher Chhotogalpo by Dr. Uttam Das. Mahadiganta Publishers, Kolkata 700 144.
Bodh Neem Sahitya Special Issue. Edited by Arunkumar Chattopadhyay, Rupnarayanpur, Bardwan, West Bengali. 2002.
Swapno Rabindra Guha Special Issue. Edited by Dr. Bishnu Chandra De. Swapna Publications, Badarpur, Assam. 2009.

External links
Drohopurush Novel
Poems of Rabindra Guha

20th-century Bengali poets
University of Calcutta alumni
20th-century Indian poets
Writers from Kolkata
Indian male novelists
1934 births
Living people
Bengali male poets
21st-century Bengali poets
21st-century Indian poets
Indian male poets
Poets from West Bengal
20th-century Indian male writers
21st-century Indian male writers